Al-Ghāshiyah (“The Overwhelming”, “The Pall”) is the 88th chapter (surah) of the Qur'an, with 26 ayat or verses. The surah's topics are Paradise, Hell and the miracle of the creation of all things by God.

Summary 

This surah refers to three broad-ranging topics. First, God describes the difference between good and evil paths that an individual can take and the consequence of each path. God then clarifies their destiny and describes what hell would be like for the non-believers. The second theme mentions the creations God has made, referring to the sky, the earth, and the mountains. Lastly, in verses 21–22, God gives a direct message to Muhammad and tells him, "So remind, [O Muhammad]; you are only a reminder. You are not over them a controller."

Ayat (verses)
1-3 The terrible day of judgment
4-7 Description of the torments of hell
8-16 The joyful state of the Muslims on the judgment-day
17-20 God manifests himself in his works
21-22 Muhammad only to warn, not to rule over, the infidels
23-26 God will himself punish the unbelievers

Hadith
The first and foremost exegesis/tafsir of the Qur'an is found in hadith of Muhammad. Although scholars including ibn Taymiyyah claim that Muhammad has commented on the whole of the Qur'an, others including Ghazali cite the limited amount of narratives, thus indicating that he has commented only on a portion of the Qur'an. Ḥadīth (حديث) is literally "speech" or "report", that is a recorded saying or tradition of Muhammad validated by isnad; with Sirah Rasul Allah these comprise the sunnah and reveal shariah. According to Aishah, the life of Muhammad was practical implementation of Qur'an. Therefore, higher count of hadith elevates the importance of the pertinent surah from a certain perspective. This surah was held in special esteem in hadith, which can be observed by these related narratives. According to hadith, Muhammad used to recite this surah in Zuhr prayer and in congregational prayers of Jumu'ah and in Eid prayers. And Muhammad used to recite this surah after surah Al-Jumua (Sura 62) or after Al-Ala (Sura 87).

 Al-Dahhak b. Qais asked al-Nu'man b. Bashir: What did the Messenger of Allah (ﷺ) recite on Friday after reciting the Surah Al-Jumua (62). He replied: He used to recite, "Had the story of overwhelming event reached you?" (Al-Ghashiyah).

 Samra ibn Jundab narrated that: The Messenger of Allah (ﷺ) used to recite in the Friday prayer: "Glorify the name of your most high Lord" (Surah 87) and Has the story of the overwhelming event reached you? (Al-Ghashiyah).

 Abu Bakr bin An-Nadr said: We were in At-Taff with Anas, and he led them in praying Zuhr. When he had finished, he said: ''I prayed Zuhr with the Messenger of Allah (ﷺ) and he recited two surahs for us in the two rak'ahs: 'Glorify the Name of your Lord, the Most High' (Quran 87) and 'Has there come to you the narration of the overwhelming?"' (Al-Ghashiyah).

 It was narrated from Ibn ‘Abbas that: The Prophet (ﷺ) used to recite in the Eid prayers ''Glorify the Name of your Lord, the Most High." (Surah 87) and "Has there come to you the narration of the overwhelming?" (Al-Ghashiyah).

 It was narrated from al-Nu'man b. Bashir that: The Messenger of Allah (ﷺ) used to recite on the two Eid prayers and on Jumu'ah: "Glorify the Name of Your Lord, the Most High" (Surah 87) and "Has there come to you the narration of The Overwhelming?" (Al-Ghashiyah) Sometimes the two (Eid and Jumu'ah) occurred on the same day, and he would recite them (these two Surahs).

References

External links
Quran 88 Clear Quran translation
Surat Al-Ghashiya (Google Translate) on Arabic Wikipedia (سورة الغاشية)
Surah Al Kafiroon

Ghashiya
Islamic eschatology
Judgment in Islam